Hong Kong participated in the 2014 Asian Games in Incheon, South Korea from 19 September to 4 October 2014.

Medal summary

Medalists

Last updated 4 October 2014

Delegation List
All members ：

NOC Representatives
OCA Vice President & NOC President
FOK Timothy Tsun Ting (霍震霆)
NOC Hon. Secretary General
PANG Chung (彭冲)
Headquarters
Chef de Mission
KWOK Chi Leung Karl (郭志樑)
Deputy Chef de Mission
LAU Chiang Chu Vivien (劉掌珠)
Thomas Brian STEVENSON (施文信)
PUI Kwan Kay (貝鈞奇)
Headquarters Official
LEUNG Mee Lee (梁美莉)
FOK Kai Kong Kenneth (霍啟剛)

Asian Federation Representatives
YUE Kwok Leung (余國樑)
HU Shao Ming Herman (胡曉明)
TONG Wai Lun (湯徫掄)
WONG Man Chiu Ronnie (王敏超)

References

Nations at the 2014 Asian Games
2014
Asian Games